The Weiwang 407 EV is an electric light, commercial 4/5-door van designed and produced by the Chinese automaker BAIC Group under the Weiwang brand since June 2018.

Overview

The Weiwang 407 EV pure electric panel van is a battery electric vehicle equipped with a 43.5 kWh battery delivering an NEDC range of 220 km or 138 miles. DC charging is supported and charging up to 80 percent requires 30 minutes. 

The 389 kg (858 lbs) battery pack has an energy density of 115.54Wh/kg. The drivetrain of the Weiwang 407 EV consists of two electric motors sitting at the front and rear of the vehicle, the motor in the front produces a maximum power of 62 kW (83 hp), while the motor in the rear is capable of producing 30 kW (41 hp). The maximum power produced by the two motors together allowed by the system is 62 kW (83 hp) . The 407 EVs front electric motor generates 220 N.m / 162 lb.ft torque, with the electric motor in the rear delivering 105 N.m / 77 lb.ft. The maximum system torque produced by the two motors combined is 220 N.m / 162 lb.ft. The maximum speed of the Weiwang 407 EV panel van is 80 km/h / 50 mph. The maximum load capacity of the Weiwang 407 EV in volume is 4.5 cubic-meters, and the maximum pay load capacity is 880 kg (1,940 lbs), and the maximum operating weight of the 407 EV is 2,410 kg (5,313 lbs).

As of 2018, pricing for the Weiwang 407 EV in China starts at 109,800.00 ¥, and 78,900 ¥ after government incentives.

References

External links
Official website

Vans
Electric vans
Vehicles introduced in 2018
2010s cars
Cars of China
Production electric cars